Son-in-law is a kinship relationship as a result of marriage.

Son-in-law may also refer to:
 Son in Law, a 1993 American comedy film
 Son-in-Law (1911–1941), British Thoroughbred racehorse
 "Son-in-Law" (8 Simple Rules episode), an episode from Season 1 of the American sitcom 8 Simple Rules

See also
 In-law (disambiguation)
 Kinship terminology